Sinezona wileyi is a species of minute sea snail, a marine gastropod mollusk or micromollusk in the family Scissurellidae, the little slit shells.

Description

Distribution
This species occurs in the Pacific Ocean off French Polynesia.

References

 Geiger D.L. (2008). New species of scissurellids from the Austral Islands, French Polynesia, and the Indo-Malayan Archipelago (Gastropoda: Vetigastropoda: Scissurellidae, Anatomidae, Larocheidae). The Nautilus 122(4): 185-200
 Geiger D.L. (2012) Monograph of the little slit shells. Volume 1. Introduction, Scissurellidae. pp. 1-728. Volume 2. Anatomidae, Larocheidae, Depressizonidae, Sutilizonidae, Temnocinclidae. pp. 729–1291. Santa Barbara Museum of Natural History Monographs Number 7.

Scissurellidae
Gastropods described in 2008